Turbonilla leta is a species of sea snail, a marine gastropod mollusk in the family Pyramidellidae, the pyrams and their allies.

Description
The shell grows to a length of 3 mm.

Distribution
This species occurs in the Atlantic Ocean off Georgia and Florida.

References

External links
 To Encyclopedia of Life
 To USNM Invertebrate Zoology Mollusca Collection
 To ITIS
 To World Register of Marine Species

leta
Gastropods described in 1927